Haijian 26 is a China Marine Surveillance (CMS) ship in the 1st Marine Surveillance Flotilla of the North China Sea Fleet. Haijian 26 has been conducting periodic, regular cruise operations in the disputed waters around the Diaoyu Islands. On May 27, 2013, Haijian 26 cruise group (including Haijian 26, 46, and 66) entered the disputed waters around the Diaoyu Islands to expel fishing boats sailed by Japanese right-wing Ganbare Nippon activists.

This class also includes Haijian 75, Haijian 66, and Haijian 23.

Haijian 26 was renamed China Coast Guard 1126 in July 2013.

References

Ships of the China Marine Surveillance